Brown Scarp is a narrow wedgelike massif which has a notable southern escarpment but moderate northern slopes. It was named by the Advisory Committee on Antarctic Names in 1994 after Arthur J. Brown, Deputy Program Director (1982–90), ITT Antarctic Services, Inc., corporate contractor to the National Science Foundation (NSF) in Antarctica; from 1994, Head of Safety, Environment, and Health Implementation Team, Office of Polar Programs, NSF.

References 

Mountains of Victoria Land
Scott Coast